WKHS (90.5 FM) is a non-commercial educational FM radio station licensed to serve Worton, Maryland. The station is owned by Kent County Public Schools (with the broadcast license held by the Board of Education of Kent County, Maryland), and is staffed by students of Kent County High School while school is in session and community volunteers during evening hours. The station simulcasts the programming of WXPN (licensed to serve Philadelphia, Pennsylvania) during overnight hours, on weekends and during the summer.

WKHS celebrated 40 years on the air on March 28, 2014.

References

External links

KHS
NPR member stations
High school radio stations in the United States
Community radio stations in the United States
Adult album alternative radio stations in the United States
Radio stations established in 1974
1974 establishments in Maryland